Nash Lowis (born 6 November 1999) is an Australian javelin thrower.

A Queenslander, he won the gold medal at the 2018 IAAF World U20 Championships in Tampere, with a personal best throw. He increased his personal best to 80.10m on June 1, 2019 in Townsville, before winning the gold medal at the 2019 Oceania Athletics Championships in the same city on June 26, with a championship record 79.10m.

References

1999 births
Living people
Australian male javelin throwers